Laeken Cemetery in Brussels, Belgium, is the city's oldest cemetery still in function and the resting place of the Belgian Royal Family. It is known as the Belgian Père Lachaise, after Paris' notorious cemetery, because it is the burial place of the rich and the famous and for the abundance of its funerary heritage.

Description
The installation of the Belgian Royal Family in 1831 and the burial of Queen Louise in 1850 contributed to the appeal of Laeken.

The cemetery houses very fine examples of 19th-century funerary art and also features an original bronze cast of Auguste Rodin's Thinker, purchased in 1927 by the antiquarian and art collector Josef Dillen to use as his own memorial. Next to the entrance, there is a small museum dedicated to the sculptor Ernest Salu and his successors.

Notable interments

Personalities buried there include:
 Alphonse Balat (1818–1895), architect
 Charles Auguste de Bériot (1802–1870), violinist and composer
 Jacques Coghen (1791–1858), Finance Minister and ancestor of King Philippe
 Michel de Ghelderode (1898–1962), writer
 Camille Jenatzy (1868–1913), race-car driver
 Fernand Khnopff (1858–1921), painter
 Maria Malibran (1808–1836), opera singer, with a work by sculptor Guillaume Geefs
 Joseph Poelaert (1817–1879), architect
 Louis-Joseph Seutin (1793–1862), surgeon
 Léon Suys (1823–1887), architect
 Augustus Van Dievoet (1803–1865), jurisconsult
 Parthon de Von family

Graves

See also

 List of cemeteries in Belgium
 Brussels Cemetery
 Ixelles Cemetery
 Molenbeek-Saint-Jean Cemetery
 Saint-Josse-ten-Noode Cemetery
 Schaerbeek Cemetery

References

Notes

Cemeteries in Belgium
Buildings and structures in Brussels
Tourist attractions in Brussels
Geography of Brussels
Culture in Brussels